Mike ( – January 1929) was a cat who guarded the gates of the British Museum whose fame was such that Time magazine devoted two articles to him on his death. E. A. Wallis Budge's work describing the life of Mike has been viewed as the zenith of such biographical writing.

Early life
In the spring of 1908 "Black Jack", the house cat of the Museum, walked up to the Keeper of Egyptian antiquities E. A. Wallis Budge with a large object in his mouth which he then deposited at the Keeper's feet. The object was a kitten, later known as Mike. The following year Mike began to study under Black Jack who taught the younger cat to stalk pigeons by pointing like a dog. Under Black Jack's guidance Mike would proceed to corner the pigeons, daze them, then bring them to the housekeeper, who would exchange the bird for a morsel of food and milk, and release them unharmed.

Later life
Mike spent 20 years at the British Museum during which time he gained a certain notoriety for his misogynistic and cynophobic tendencies, pushing away any attempt at fraternisation with women and having a dislike for dogs.  Mike would only allow certain people to feed him, those "who treated him as a man and brother". Interest in Mike spread such that he was described as "probably the most famed British feline of the 20th Century".

Mike retired from official duties in 1924, and was made a 'pensioner'. He continued to take an interest in the comings-and-goings at the Museum, and was especially active when it came to chasing off the occasional wandering dogs, who reportedly "fled in terror" when he attacked.

In 1927, Mike was featured in an article in the Star, which stated that: "He eyes the scholarsfamous men from all countriesas philosophically as the later stream of mere curiosity-hunters. High School girls in trim uniform; London street urchins, who make the portico a playground; black-robed monks, gaily sari-ed Hindu ladies, dapper little Japs, and horn-spectacled tourists, are all alike to him."

When Mike died Wallis Budge contributed to the Evening Standard an obituary of  Mike which became the basis of his monograph "Mike, the cat who assisted in keeping the main gate of the British Museum from February 1909 to January 1929". This work includes an ode composed by F. C. W. Hiley which ends:
Old Mike! Farewell! We all regret you, 
Although, you  would not let us pet you; 
Of cats the wisest, oldest best cat, 
This be  your motto — Requiescat!

Mike's tombstone was erected near the Great Russell Street entrance and the inscription reads: "He assisted in keeping the main gate of the British Museum from February 1909 to January 1929."

See also
 List of individual cats

References
 E. A. Wallis Budge (1929), "Mike", the cat who assisted in keeping the main gate of the British Museum from February 1909 to January 1929, R.  Clay & Sons, Ltd., Bungay. Suffolk

 Nigel Barley. Requiescat: A Cat's Life at the British Museum, 2013.

Notes

1908 animal births
1929 animal deaths
British Museum
Individual cats in England
Working cats